José Gerson da Cunha (2 February 1844 – 3 August 1900) was a Goan physician who achieved international renown as an orientalist, historian, linguist and numismatist.

Early life and medical career
José Gerson da Cunha was born in Arpora, Bardez on 2 February 1844, the eldest of twelve children to a Goan Catholic (Christian Brahmin) couple, Francisco Caetano da Cunha and Leopoldina Maria Gonçalves. Francisco was an infantry lieutenant in the Portuguese army stationed in Goa who had taken part in the military campaign against the Marathas at Uspa and Rarim in Savantvadi. The family traced its descent to Balkrishna Shenoy, also known as Balsa Sinai; a 16th-century Goud Saraswat Brahmin from Cortalim in Salcette. Upon his employment by the Portuguese authorities in 1555, Balkrishna moved to Pilerne in Bardez with his two nephews Mangappa and Panduranga Shenoy. There he converted to Christianity and adopted the surname "da Cunha". He later settled down in Arpora. His conversion had been preceded by that of his nephew Mangappa who changed his name to Pero Ribeiro and earned the distinction of being the first Christian of Bardez.

Da Cunha did his primary studies and study of humanities in Panjim. He then moved to Bombay and enrolled in the Grant Medical College to pursue his medical studies. While there, da Cunha distinguished himself by winning many prizes. However, he failed to obtain his licentiate in medicine, and instead obtained the first licentiate degree from the University of Bombay in 1864. He moved to London in 1867 to obtain his degree and in the same year, obtained the diplomas of L.R.C.P. Lond. and M.R.C.S Eng. Cunha specialised in obstetrics at Edinburgh and London. He returned to Bombay in 1868, where he soon acquired a large practice.

Works
Da Cunha wrote several papers on obstetrics which attracted much attention at the Medico-Physical Society of Bombay. After an epidemic of dengue in the city, he wrote an essay on dengue entitled Dengue: its history, symptoms and treatment. Besides medicine, Cunha's interest spanned across diverse subjects such as history, archaeology, linguistics, numismatics and Sanskritology (study of Sanskrit). He wrote and distinguished himself more by creating works of historical value on these subjects. Besides papers, he was the author of 20 books on these subjects. His decision to write his works in English gained him greater recognition amongst English readers than those by Goan authors who had chosen to write on these subjects only in Portuguese.

History
Da Cunha wrote the first book on the history of Bombay, The Origin of Bombay which was published posthumously by the Bombay branch of the Royal Asiatic Society in 1900. His other best known historical works include Memoir on the history of the tooth-relic of Ceylon; with a preliminary essay on Gautama Buddha The life and system of Gautama Buddha (1875), Historical and Archeological Sketch of the Island of Angediva (1875), and The History and Antiquities of Chaul and Bassein (1876).

Linguistics
Da Cunha was inspired by the Portuguese civil servant Joaquim Heliodoro da Cunha Rivara's efforts to revive Konkani in Goa. In 1881, he wrote a scholarly work on the language entitled The Konkani Language and Literature, wherein he discussed its origin and issues. Using the arguments of the Language theory, he demonstrated that Konkani was an independent language in its own right with its own dialects, such as Kudali, Goadesi and the southern form. Cunha concluded that while Konkani bears close similarities to Marathi, it is quite distinct, though cognate with Marathi, and has a predominance of Sanskrit words and a faint Turanian or Dravidian element. It possesses an elaborate grammar of its own and a rich vocabulary which is derived from various sources (Sanskrit, Persian, Kannada and Portuguese, with all the contributing elements having lost their autonomy in the course of time and becoming so fused together that only a careful analysis can discover their etymology.

Da Cunha was greatly concerned with the increasing corruption of Konkani's purity, as he felt that the incorporation of Portuguese, Persian, Kannada, and Marathi loanwords were distancing the language from its original source, Sanskrit. He further had serious misgivings about the language's future. In The Konkani Language and Literature, he states:

Numismatics
Da Cunha was an avid coin collector. He began collecting coins in 1876 and in addition to his own collection, purchased the collections of James Gibbs and Bhau Dhaji. By  1888, his personal collection had expanded to include over 27,000 pieces of gold, silver, and other metals. The collection of coins catalogued by da Cunha was generally believed to be among the best in the British Empire. This catalogue was published in Bombay in 1888. He wrote a book on numismatics, Indo-Portuguese Numismatics which was published in 1956 by Agencia Geral do Ultramar in Lisbon. This work is generally believed to be one of the few valuable studies in this field.

Associations
In view of his work, da Cunha acquired significant fame as an Orientalist and was invited to International seminars and conferences. In addition to his affiliation with various medical associations in Bombay, his prolific contributions to Indian history and linguistics earned him the fellowship of the Instituto Vasco da Gama in Goa in 1871, and of the Royal Asiatic Society of Bombay in 1873. He received a prize at the Congress of Orientalists in Florence in 1877, and was a prominent figure at the Twelfth Congress held in Rome in 1899. In the latter conference, da Cunha was hailed by the Count Angelo de Gubernatis as the "leading Orientalist of the day". He served as president of the Bombay chapters of the Royal Asiatic Society and the Anthropological Society. He was a Knight of the Order of the Crown of Italy, of the Order of St. Gregory the Great, and of the Order of Saint James of the Sword.

Personal life
Da Cunha was married to Ana Rita da Gama. They had two daughters and a son. His grandson EPW da Costa was a pioneer of opinion polling in India. Da Cunha was a hyperpolyglot, possessing knowledge of Konkani, Marathi, Portuguese, Italian, French, English, German, Pahlavi, Persian, Latin and Sanskrit.

Bibliography

Citations

References 

.

.
.

.

1844 births
1900 deaths
Medical doctors from Goa
People from North Goa district
Indian Roman Catholics
Portuguese Roman Catholics
19th-century Indian medical doctors
Indian obstetricians
19th-century Indian historians
19th-century Indian linguists
Indian orientalists
Portuguese orientalists
Indian numismatists
Portuguese numismatists
19th-century Portuguese historians
19th-century Indian male writers
Knights of St. Gregory the Great
Knights of the Order of Saint James of the Sword